Costosyrnola thailandica is a species of sea snail, a marine gastropod mollusc in the family Pyramidellidae, the pyrams and their allies. The species is one of a number within the genus Costosyrnola. The other species being Costosyrnola nitidissima.

Distribution
This marine species occurs off the Gulf of Thailand.

References

External links
 To World Register of Marine Species

Pyramidellidae
Gastropods described in 2004